Aderlan de Lima Silva (born 18 August 1990), simply known as Aderlan, is a Brazilian professional footballer who plays as a right back for Bragantino.

Career
Born in Campina Grande, Paraíba, Aderlan finished his formation with hometown club Campinense. He made his first team debut on 8 May 2009, coming on as a second-half substitute in a 2–1 Série B home loss against Duque de Caxias.

Aderlan scored his first senior goal on 20 September 2009, netting the game's only through a penalty in an away success over Sociedade Esportiva Queimadense, for the year's Copa Paraíba. In March 2011, after being sparingly used, he moved to Joinville, but never played a single match for the club.

In late 2011, Aderlan returned to his native state and joined Treze for the Copa Paraíba. The following January, he was loaned to Itapipoca, but returned to his parent club for the 2012 Série C, and was sold to an unnamed group of investors in October 2012.

On 10 January 2013, Aderlan agreed to a contract with Corinthians Alagoano. A regular starter, he was loaned to CSA for the 2013 Série D, but only featured in one match before having his federative rights assigned to Santa Rita, after the club merged with Corinthians in 2014.

Aderlan moved abroad for the first time in his career on 4 June 2014, after agreeing to a two-year loan deal with Portuguese Primeira Liga side Académica de Coimbra. He made his debut abroad on 14 September, starting in a 1–0 away loss against Boavista FC, and scored his first goal on 2 November in a 1–1 home draw against SC Braga.

On 14 December 2016, Aderlan was announced at Luverdense in the second division. Initially a backup, he became a regular starter during the year's Série B, contributing with one goal in 32 appearances.

On 10 January 2018, Aderlan signed for América Mineiro, still owned by Santa Rita. He made his top tier debut on 14 May, starting in a 2–2 away draw against Ceará, and finished the season as a first-choice as his team suffered relegation.

On 11 January 2019, Aderlan joined Red Bull Brasil, and also moved to Bragantino when both sides merged in April.

Career statistics

References

External links

1990 births
Living people
People from Campina Grande
Brazilian footballers
Association football defenders
Campeonato Brasileiro Série A players
Campeonato Brasileiro Série B players
Campeonato Brasileiro Série C players
Campeonato Brasileiro Série D players
Campinense Clube players
Joinville Esporte Clube players
Treze Futebol Clube players
Sport Club Corinthians Alagoano players
Centro Sportivo Alagoano players
Luverdense Esporte Clube players
América Futebol Clube (MG) players
Red Bull Brasil players
Clube Atlético Bragantino players
Primeira Liga players
Associação Académica de Coimbra – O.A.F. players
Brazilian expatriate footballers
Brazilian expatriate sportspeople in Portugal
Expatriate footballers in Portugal
Sportspeople from Paraíba